The New Jim Jones is the debut album by rapper Dre Dog (currently known as Andre Nickatina). It was released on June 17, 1993 for independent record label, In-a-Minute Records and was produced by Dre Dog and T.C. The album featured one single entitled "The Ave." and was eventually re-released with a less controversial cover for Mo Beatz Records in 2006.

Track listing
"Lets Get High" - 1:24
"Most Hated Man in Frisco" - 3:08
"The Ave." - 4:27
"Smoke Dope & Rap" - 4:36
"Off That Chewy" - 3:46
"Chinese Cat" - 0:36
"Lips" - 5:16
"Jim Jones Posse" - 4:41
"Dirty Ass Rats" (Ft. Totally Insane) - 4:53 
"Alcatraz" - 3:57
"Dogs & Cats" - 1:26

The Ave Cassette Single B-Side: Chocolate Ty

Samples
Alcatraz
"Freddie's Dead" by Curtis Mayfield
"Funky Worm" by Ohio Players
Dirty Ass Rats
"The Champ" by The Mohawks
Lips
"Between the Sheets" by The Isley Brothers
Smoke Dope and Rap
"Hook and Sling - Part I" by Eddie Bo
"I' Been Watchin' You" by Southside Movement
The Ave.
"Juicy Fruit" by Mtume

1993 debut albums
Andre Nickatina albums